Durley Mill  is a hamlet between Botley and Bishops Waltham in Hampshire, England. It once had a small intermediate halt  on the Bishops Waltham branch.

External links

Villages in Hampshire